Orbiraja is a genus of small skates in the family Rajidae from the western and central Indo-Pacific. Prior to 2016, they were included in the genus Okamejei.

Species
There are three species in the genus:

 Orbiraja jensenae (Last & A. P. K. Lim, 2010) (Sulu Sea skate)
 Orbiraja philipi (Lloyd, 1906)
 Orbiraja powelli (Alcock, 1898) (Indian ringed skate)

References 

Rajidae
Ray genera